Theodor Niederbach (born 25 February 2002) is a Swedish ice hockey forward currently playing for Rögle BK of the Swedish Hockey League (SHL). Niederbach was drafted 51st overall by the Detroit Red Wings in the 2020 NHL Entry Draft. He made his professional debut with Frölunda HC during the 2020–21 season.

Career statistics

International

References

External links
 

2002 births
Living people
Detroit Red Wings draft picks
Frölunda HC players
Modo Hockey players
People from Örnsköldsvik Municipality
Rögle BK players
Swedish ice hockey centres
Sportspeople from Västernorrland County